Gairibans (2621 m), located near the India - Nepal border, is a small settlement inside the Singalila National Park in the Darjeeling Sadar subdivision, Darjeeling district in the state of West Bengal, India. It is a roadside halt along the trekking route from Manebhanjan to Sandakphu.

Villages in Darjeeling district